

The NBC Tower is an office tower on the Near North Side of Chicago, Illinois located at 454 North Columbus Drive (455 North Cityfront Plaza is also used as a vanity address for the building) in downtown Chicago's Magnificent Mile area. Completed in 1989, the 37-story building reaches a height of 627 feet (191 m). NBC's Chicago offices, studios, and owned-and-operated station WMAQ-TV are located here as of 1989 and on October 1, 1989, WMAQ-TV broadcast its first newscast at 10:00 that evening at its new home, NBC Tower, with the then-weeknight news team of Ron Magers, Carol Marin, John Coleman, and Mark Giangreco. Later, Telemundo O&O WSNS-TV has also occupied the building since its purchase by NBC in 2001. Formerly its former radio sister WMAQ/WSCR was located here. The studios of NBC's former Chicago FM property, WKQX, and its sister station WLUP-FM are located in the NBC Tower.

The design, by Adrian D. Smith of Skidmore, Owings & Merrill, is considered one of the finest reproductions of the Art Deco style. It was inspired by 30 Rockefeller Plaza in New York City, which is NBC's global headquarters. The tower is further enhanced by the use of limestone piers and recessed tinted glass with granite spandrels.  The building takes additional cues from the nearby landmark Tribune Tower with the use of flying buttresses. A  broadcast tower and spire tops the skyscraper. WMAQ and WSNS have STL and satellite facilities on the roof; the STLs link to WMAQ and WSNS's transmitter facilities atop the Willis Tower. WMAQ radio/WSCR studios and STL were located in the building until 2006 when they relocated to Two Prudential Plaza.

Located in the Cityfront Plaza area, the building contains  of space and three floors of underground parking with 261 spaces. Connected to the main tower is a four-story radio and television broadcasting facility where popular shows such as Judge Mathis and WSNS's newscasts and WMAQ's newscasts are currently taped, and was the former recording facility for Jerry Springer and The Steve Wilkos Show before their tax credit-influenced move to Stamford, Connecticut in 2009. It was also home to the 1990s syndicated improv/sketch show Kwik Witz, The Jenny Jones Show until its cancellation in 2003, and Steve Harvey its move to Los Angeles in 2017.

Tenants
WMAQ/NBC, WSNS/Telemundo are located in the building. The Consulate-General of India in Chicago is located in Suite 850. The Consulate-General of South Korea in Chicago is located in Suite 2700. The Consulate-General of Lithuania in Chicago is located in Suite 800.  CBS Media Ventures' Chicago branch is located in Suite 2910.

 WMAQ-TV newscasts (1989–present)
 WSNS-TV (2002–present)
 WKQX (1989-2001; 2016–present)
 WCKL (formerly WLUP-FM) (2016–present)
 WLS (2017–present)
 WLS-FM (2017–present)

The tower was also the world headquarters of Navistar International until 2000 when the company announced plans to relocate to west suburban Lisle, Illinois.

From the tower's opening to 2006,  WMAQ/WSCR radio studios were also located in the building; the stations relocated.

In February 2016, alternative station WKQX and sister classic rock station WLUP-FM announced that they will be moving from their longtime home in the Merchandise Mart to a new studio in the tower. WKQX and WLUP-FM operated temporarily from the former WLS studios at 190 N. State St. On August 4, 2016, the move of WKQX and WLUP-FM to the tower was finalized.

Shows recorded
In addition to housing these entities, the studios were/are home to the following shows:

 iVillage Live (2007)
 The Jenny Jones Show (1991–2003)
 Jerry Springer (1991–2009; originated and recorded here from 1992 to 2009)
 Judge Jeanine Pirro (2008–2011)
 Johnny B... On the Loose (1991)
 Judge Mathis (1999–present)
 Kwik Witz (1996–1999)
 Merv Griffin's Crosswords (2007–2008, pilot shows only)
 Sports Action Team (2006–2007)
 The Steve Wilkos Show (2007–2009, moved to Connecticut in 2009)
 Steve Harvey (2012–2017)

See also
 NBC Studios
 List of skyscrapers
 List of tallest buildings in the United States
 List of tallest buildings in Chicago
 World's tallest structures

References

External links

 Emporis listing
 Official website
 Skidmore, Owings, and Merrill
 WMAQ's official website
 WSNS' official website
 WSCR's official website

Skidmore, Owings & Merrill buildings
Comcast
National Broadcasting Company
NBC buildings
NBCUniversal
Skyscraper office buildings in Chicago
Mass media company headquarters in the United States
Television studios in the United States
Art Deco architecture in Illinois
Leadership in Energy and Environmental Design basic silver certified buildings
Office buildings completed in 1989
1989 establishments in Illinois